Leopoldo de Gregorio, 1st Marquess of Esquilache, OWE (Messina, December 23, 1699 – Venice, September 15, 1785), known in Spanish as Marqués de Esquilache and in Italian as Marchese di Squilliace, was a Sicilian-born Spanish statesman who was Minister of Finance of Spain between 1759 and 1766.

Biography 
Born in Messina, de Gregorio was one of Enlightenment Spain's leading statesmen from the arrival of Charles III to the Marquis's death in 1785. His ability as a military supplier for the Neapolitan army impressed the king and raised him to royal prominence. He was created "Marquis of Squillace" in 1755.

Charles III had been introduced to reform by his mentor in Sicily, Bernardo Tanucci. Although Tanucci remained behind in the Two Sicilies to advise Charles's son, King Ferdinand I of the Two Sicilies, as the two thrones could not be united by consequence of treaty, Charles carried with him a cadre of Italian reformers who saw potential in the Spanish bureaucracy for modernization. De Gregorio was one of them, and was the architect of the first phase of Charles' reforms.

His attempt to modernize the apparel of the average Spaniard resulted in the Esquilache Riots and in his dismissal.  Charles was forced to make Esquilache ambassador to Venice.  It was a move that both Charles and Esquilache lamented. Esquilache felt that his measures  in Spain had deserved a statue, and would comment that he had cleaned and paved the city streets and had created boulevards, and had nevertheless been dismissed.

He died in Venice.

References

Leopoldo de Gregorio, Marquis of Squillace
Leopoldo de Gregorio, Marquis of Squillace
Squillace, marchese
Spanish people of Italian descent
Economy and finance ministers of Spain
Leopoldo de Gregorio, Marquis of Squillace
Ambassadors of Spain to the Republic of Venice
Recipients of the Order of the White Eagle (Poland)